The Atnarko River is a river in the Canadian province of British Columbia.

Course
The Atnarko River flows originates at Charlotte Lake. For much of its length the river flows through Tweedsmuir South Provincial Park.

See also
List of British Columbia rivers

References

Rivers of the Pacific Ranges
Bella Coola Valley
Rivers of British Columbia
Range 3 Coast Land District